Emilio Álava (5 May 1889 – 18 April 1974) was a sports shooter from Spain. He competed in the 25 m pistol event at the 1952 Summer Olympics.

References

1889 births
1974 deaths
Spanish male sport shooters
Olympic shooters of Spain
Shooters at the 1952 Summer Olympics
People from Vitoria-Gasteiz
20th-century Spanish people